The 437th Fighter-Interceptor Squadron is an inactive United States Air Force unit.  Its last assignment was with 414th Fighter Group at Oxnard Air Force Base, California, where it was inactivated on 30 September 1969.

The squadron was first activated during World War II as the 437th Fighter Squadron, a very long range fighter escort squadron.  It deployed to the Pacific Ocean Theater a month before the Japanese surrender in August 1945, and flew several escort and fighter sweep missions over Japan before the end of the war.  It moved to the Philippines after the war ended and was inactivated there in 1946.

It was reactivated at Otis Air Force Base, Massachusetts in 1952 as the 437th Fighter-Interceptor Squadron.  It moved to California in 1955 and served there until the spring of 1968.  it was briefly reactivated in 1968, but was discontinued and transferred its personnel and equipment to another unit in September 968.

History

World War II
The squadron was first established in late 1944 at Seymour Johnson Field, North Carolina as the 437th Fighter Squadron, one of the three original squadrons of the 414th Fighter Group. The 414th was a very long range Republic P-47N Thunderbolt fighter group that trained under I Fighter Command at Selfridge Field, Michigan and Bluethenthal Field, North Carolina.

The squadron deployed by ship to Iwo Jima in the Pacific Ocean Theater where it became part of Twentieth Air Force as a long-range escort squadron for Boeing B-29 Superfortress bombers engaged in strategic bombing campaign against Japan.   The extreme length of these escort missions stretched the fuel capacity of the squadron's Thunderbolts.  Lt. Robert Dunnavant, piloting a squadron P-47N, spent the astonishing period of 8 hours and 45 minutes in the air. His aircraft's fuel tanks were so depleted when he eventually reached Iwo Jima, that he dared not try to reach his base at North Field, landing instead at a small US Navy airstrip he located on the coast.

After the Japanese surrender the squadron moved to Luzon where it was assigned to Thirteenth Air Force, with its P-47Ns replaced by North American P-51 Mustangs.    It was inactivated in 1946.

Cold War Air Defense

The squadron was reactivated in November 1952 as an Air Defense Command (ADC) interceptor squadron at Otis Air Force Base, Massachusetts with Lockheed F-94C Starfires.  The F-94C was the first model of the Starfire to be entirely armed with FFAR rockets, eliminating the cannon armament of earlier models. It was the first operational F-94C unit. By June 1955, The squadron had replaced its Starfires with Northrop F-89D Scorpions.

In August 1955 ADC implemented Project Arrow, which was designed to bring back on the active list the fighter units which had compiled memorable records in the two world wars.  As a result, the squadron was transferred on paper to Oxnard Air Force Base, California, where it assumed the personnel and F-94C aircraft of the 354th Fighter-Interceptor Squadron and rejoined its World War II headquarters, the 414th Fighter Group. By the start of April 1956 it again transitioned into F-89Ds, adding F-89Hs in July. The H model was armed with GAR-1 Falcons in addition to the unguided FFAR rockets.  In spring 1958, it replaced its F-89Hs with F-89Js, which were equipped with the MB-1 Genie with a nuclear warhead.  Nuclear armed Scorpions were only placed on thirty-minute “standby alert” in addition to the unit’s requirement to maintain aircraft on five minute alert armed with conventional weapons.

In January 1960 the squadron was re-equipped with new McDonnell F-101B Voodoo supersonic interceptor, and the F-101F operational and conversion trainer. The two-seat trainer version was equipped with dual controls, but carried the same armament as the F-101B and were fully combat-capable.  In February 1962, ADC increased the alert requirement for its units.  In addition to the two aircraft each squadron had been maintaining on five minute alert, one third of the unit’s aircraft were placed on fifteen minute alert.

On 22 October 1962, at the beginning of the Cuban Missile Crisis, when President Kennedy announced the presence of Soviet intermediate-range ballistic missiles in Cuba. Continental Air Defense Command increased its weapons readiness status.  This required the squadron to place all its planes on five minute alert. Later that day, North American Air Defense Command directed that one third of the squadron's Voodoos "in a quiet, low-key fashion" be flown to their interim dispersal bases. This dispersal included squadron aircraft flying with their weapons to the dispersal base, including those armed with Genies.  On 17 November, after it had been confirmed that missiles and bombers had been removed from Cuba, the dispersed aircraft began to return to Oxnard.  On 27 November, the squadron returned to normal alert status.

Although the number of ADC interceptor squadrons remained almost constant in the early 1960s, attrition (and the fact that production lines closed in 1961) caused a gradual drop in the number of planes assigned to a squadron, from 24 to typically 18 by 1964.  The force reduction continued, finally resulting in a reduction in the number of interceptor units.  As a result of this reduction, the squadron was inactivated in April 1968, and its aircraft were passed along to the Air National Guard.

Meanwhile, the 456th Fighter-Interceptor Squadron at Castle Air Force Base, California transferred its Convair F-106A Delta Darts and supporting personnel and equipment to Oxnard.  Once the transfer was complete, the 437th was again activated, using the personnel and equipment of the 456th. However, on 30 September 1968 the squadron was inactivated and its personnel, mission and equipment were transferred to the 460th Fighter-Interceptor Squadron, which was activated at Oxnard the same day. The 437th operated the F-106 for only 3 months, making it the shortest-lived F-106 unit.

Lineage
 Constituted as the 437th Fighter Squadron, Single Engine on 5 October 1944
 Activated on 15 October 1944
 Inactivated on 30 September 1946
 Redesignated 437th Fighter-Interceptor Squadron on 14 November 1952
 Activated on 27 November 1952
 Inactivated 29 April 1968
 Activated on 1 July 1968
 Inactivated on 30 September 1968

Assignments
 414th Fighter Group, 15 October 1944 – 30 September 1946
 4707th Air Defense Wing, 27 November 1952
 564th Air Defense Group, 16 February 1953
 414th Fighter Group, 18 August 1955 – 29 April 1968
 414th Fighter Group, 1 June 1968 – 30 September 1968

Stations
 Seymour Johnson Field, North Carolina, 15 October 1944
 Selfridge Field, Michigan, 21 November 1944
 Bluethenthal Field, North Carolina, 19 March – 5 June 1945
 North Field (Iwo Jima), 7 July 1945
 Clark Field, Luzon, Philippines, 23 December 1945
 Floridablanca Airfield, Luzon, Philippines, unknown-30 September 1946
 Otis Air Force Base, Massachusetts, 27 November 1952
 Oxnard Air Force Base, California, 18 August 1955 – 29 April 1968
 Oxnard Air Force Base, California, 1 June 1968 – 30 September 1968

Aircraft

 Republic P-47N Thunderbolt, 1944–1946
 Lockheed F-94C Starfire, 1952–1955, 1955–1956
 Northrop F-89D Scorpion, 1955, 1956–1958
 Northrop F-89H Scorpion, 1956–1958

 Northrop F-89J Scorpion, 1958–1960
 McDonnell F-101B Voodoo, 1960–1968
 McDonnell F-101F Voodoo, 1960–1968
 Convair F-106A Delta Dart, 1968

References

Notes
 Explanatory notes

 Citations

Bibliography

 Buss, Lydus H.(ed), Sturm, Thomas A., Volan, Denys, and McMullen, Richard F., History of Continental Air Defense Command and Air Defense Command July to December 1955, Directorate of Historical Services, Air Defense Command, Ent AFB, CO, (1956)
 
 
 
 McMullen, Richard F. (1964) The Fighter Interceptor Force 1962-1964, ADC Historical Study No. 27 (Confidential, declassified 22 March 2000)
 Ray, Thomas W. “Nuclear Armament: Its Acquisition, Control and Application to Manned Interceptors 1951-1963” ADC Historical Study No. 20, Air Defense Command, Ent AFB, CO (Secret- Restricted Data, redacted version declassified 20 June 1996)
 
 NORAD/CONAD Participation in the Cuban Missile Crisis, Historical Reference Paper No. 8, Directorate of Command History Continental Air Defense Command, Ent AFB, CO , 1 Feb 63 (Top Secret NOFORN declassified 9 March 1996)
 

 Further reading
  Grant, C.L., (1961)  The Development of Continental Air Defense to 1 September 1954, USAF Historical Study No. 126
 
 

Fighter squadrons of the United States Air Force
Aerospace Defense Command units